Lock and Dam No. 24 is a lock and dam located near Clarksville, Missouri around river mile 273.4 on the Upper Mississippi River. The auxiliary lock is not operational. Normal pool elevation behind the dam is 449 feet. A  submersible earthen dike extends from the movable dam to the Illinois shore. In 2004, the facility was listed in the National Register of Historic Places as Lock and Dam No. 24 Historic District, #04000183 covering , 3 buildings, 15 structures, 4 objects.

See also
 List of locks and dams of the Upper Mississippi River
 Public Works Administration dams list

References

External links
Lock and Dam No. 24 - U.S. Army Corps of Engineers
Clarksville Visitor center, near the lock and dam with additional dimensions of the dam
Lock 24
Historic American Engineering Record documentation:

Dams completed in 1940
Mississippi River locks
Transportation buildings and structures in Calhoun County, Illinois
Buildings and structures in Pike County, Missouri
Dams in Missouri
Dams in Illinois
24
United States Army Corps of Engineers dams
Transport infrastructure completed in 1940
Gravity dams
Dams on the Mississippi River
Mississippi Valley Division
Historic American Engineering Record in Illinois
Historic American Engineering Record in Missouri
Historic districts on the National Register of Historic Places in Missouri
National Register of Historic Places in Pike County, Missouri
24
24
24